"Dirty Picture" is a 2010 song by Taio Cruz.

Dirty Picture may also refer to:

 Dirty Pictures (1971 film) or Oasis of Fear, a 1971 Italian giallo film
 Dirty Pictures, a 2000 television film about the 1990 Robert Mapplethorpe case
 The Dirty Picture, a 2011 Hindi film
 Dirty Picture: Silk Sakkath Maga, a 2013 Indian film by Trishul